Isatin, also known as tribulin, is an organic compound derived from indole with formula C8H5NO2. The compound was first obtained by Otto Linné Erdman  and Auguste Laurent  in 1840 as a product from the oxidation of indigo dye by nitric acid and chromic acids.

Isatin is a well-known natural product which can be found in plants of the genus Isatis, in Couroupita guianensis, and also in humans, as a metabolic derivative of adrenaline. 

It looks like a red-orange powder, and it is usually employed as building block for the synthesis of a wide variety of biologically active compounds including antitumorals,  antivirals,  anti-HIVs,  and antituberculars. 

The isatin core is also responsible for the color of “Maya blue” and “Maya yellow” dyes.

Synthesis

Sandmeyer methodology
The Sandmeyer methodology is the oldest and straightforward way for the synthesis of isatin. The method involves the condensation between chloral hydrate and a primary arylamine (e.g. aniline), in the presence of hydroxylamine hydrochloride, in aqueous sodium sulfate to form an α‐isonitrosoacetanilide. Isolation of this intermediate and subsequent electrophilic cyclization promoted by strong acids (e.g. sulfuric acid) furnishes isatin in >75% yield.

Stolle methodology
The Stolle procedure is considered the best alternative to Sandmeyer methodology for the synthesis of both substituted and unsubstituted isatins.  In this case primary or secondary arylamines are condensed with oxalyl chloride to form a chlorooxalylanilide intermediate which can then cyclize in the presence of a Lewis acid (e.g. aluminium trichloride, titanium tetrachloride, boron trifluoride, etc.).

Other procedures
More recent approaches to the synthesis of N-substituted isatins involves the direct oxidation of commercially available, substituted indoles or oxindoles with different oxidizing agents such as TBHP,  IBX-SO3K,  tBuONO  etc.

Reactivity
The presence of an aromatic ring, a ketone and a γ-lactam moiety, gives to isatin the rare potential to be used as both an electrophile and a nucleophile: indeed, it undergoes an enormous number of reactions, such as N-substitutions, electrophilic aromatic substitution at positions C-5 and C-7 of the phenyl ring, nucleophilic additions onto the C-3 carbonyl group, chemoselective reductions, oxidations, ring-expansions and spiro-annulations. Because of this unique reactivity, isatin is considered one of the most valuable building blocks in organic synthesis.

N-Substitution
The N-functionalization of the isatin core can be readily obtained by the deprotonation of the amino moiety, forming the corresponding sodium or potassium salt, and subsequent addition of an electrophile (e.g. alkyl or acyl halides).

On the other hand, N-arylation is usually achieved by cross-coupling reactions with aryl halides using copper al palladium catalysts.

Ring expansion
In the field of organic synthesis, ring expansions are considered valuable reactions since they allow the obtainment medium-size ring (7-9 atoms) which are difficult to synthesize through "classical" methods.

To date, only few articles concerning the ring expansion of isatin derivatives has been reported.
The first one is an acid-catalyzed one-pot multicomponent reaction involving isatins, aminouracils, and isooxazolones to form isoxazoquinolines, important scaffolds in medicinal chemistry.

In another one-pot multicomponent reaction, a unique two-carbon expansion has been achieved by reacting isatin with indene-1,3-dione and N-substituted pyridinium bromide to form dibenzo[b,d]azepin-6-ones.

C-2/C-3 nucleophilic addition
Isatin suffers nucleophilic addition on carbonyls at C-2 and C-3 positions. The regioselectivity of the process strongly depends both on the substrate (properties of the substituents on the isatin core, especially those bonded to the nitrogen atom) and the reaction conditions (solvent, temperature etc.). In some cases the nucleophilic addition could be followed by secondary reactions (e.g. cyclization, ring expansion, ring opening etc.)

Oxidation
The oxidation of isatin using hydrogen peroxide or chromic anhydride yields isatoic anhydride, a compound widely used either in herbicide products and in medicinal chemistry.

Dimerization
Dimerization of isatin with KBH4 in methanol yield Indirubin. This represent the indigo pigment's red component and a highly effective cytotoxic compound.

Reduction
Reduction of the non-amide carbonyl group obviously occurs to give oxindole, respectively.

See also
 Pfitzinger reaction

References

Reviews

External links

Lactams
Indolines